Gemmell is a Scottish surname. Notable people with the surname include:

 Alan Gemmell (1913–1986), Scottish biologist
 Alan Gemmell (diplomat) (born 1978), British co-founder of FiveFilms4Freedom and former Director of the British Council in India 
 Andrew Gemmell (born 1991), American swimmer
 Andy Gemmell (born 1945), Scottish footballer
 Archibald Gemmell (1869–1945), Canadian politician
 David Gemmell (1948–2006), British writer
 Dean Gemmell (born 1967), Canadian-American curler
 Dick Gemmell (1936–2017), British rugby player
 George Gemmell (1889–1965), British footballer
 Ian Gemmell (born 1953), English cricketer
 Jimmy Gemmell (1880–?), Scottish footballer
 Keith Gemmell (1948–2016), British musician
 Kris Gemmell (born 1977), New Zealand triathlete
 Nikki Gemmell (born 1966), Australian author
 Rice Gemmell (1896–1972), Australian tennis player
 Ruth Gemmell (born 1967), British actress
 Tommy Gemmell (1943−2017), Scottish football player and manager
 Tommy Gemmell (footballer, born 1930) (1930–2004), Scottish footballer
 Welland Gemmell (1910–1954), Canadian politician

See also
 Gemmell, Minnesota
 Gemmells, South Australia
 Gemmill (disambiguation)

English-language surnames
Scottish surnames